Kingston Fossil Plant, commonly known as Kingston Steam Plant, is a 1.4-gigawatt (1,398 MW) coal-fired power plant located in Roane County, just outside Kingston, Tennessee on the shore of Watts Bar Lake. It is operated by the Tennessee Valley Authority. The plant is known for the Kingston Fossil Plant fly ash spill which occurred in December 2008.

History
Construction of the Kingston Fossil Plant began on April 30, 1951. It was the largest coal-fired power plant in the world when completed in 1955. It was built primarily to provide electricity for the nearby Oak Ridge National Laboratory. A dedication ceremony for the plant took place on November 17, 1955. The plant is a popular site for birdwatchers, as many waterfowl come to the settling and treatment ponds nearby.

The plant has nine generating units: Units 1–4, rated at 175 MW each (launched into service in 1954), and Units 5–9, rated at 200 MW each (launched in 1955). Combined, the plant has a total capacity of 1,700 MWe (1,398 MWe net). It produces about ten billion kilowatt hours of electricity from some five million tons of coal each year. All nine generating units are equipped with selective catalytic reduction (SCR) systems to reduce nitrogen oxide emissions that contribute to the formation of ozone. In 1976, its original nine stacks were taken out of service (though left standing) and replaced by a pair of 1,000-foot (304.8 meter) tall chimneys, one for Units 1–5 and one for Units 6–9. These stacks were replaced with a single stack connected to scrubbers which were installed in 2007.

2008 spill 

This was the largest accidental release of coal fly ash in the United States.

EPA compliance agreement
On April 14, 2011, the U.S. Environmental Protection Agency (EPA) announced a settlement with the Tennessee Valley Authority to resolve alleged Clean Air Act violations at 11 of its coal-fired plants in Alabama, Kentucky, and Tennessee.

See also

List of power stations in Tennessee

References

External links
TVA's Kingston Fossil Plant page
News coverage of the breach of a pond dam at the coal plant on Dec. 22, 2008, Knoxville News Sentinel

Energy infrastructure completed in 1954
Energy infrastructure completed in 1955
Towers completed in 1976
Coal-fired power stations in Tennessee
Towers in Tennessee
Buildings and structures in Roane County, Tennessee
Tennessee Valley Authority
Chimneys in the United States
1954 establishments in Tennessee